Norway was represented at the 1972 Summer Olympics in Munich by the Norwegian Olympic Committee and Confederation of Sports. 112 competitors, 101 men and 11 women, took part in 70 events in 15 sports.

Medalists
Norway finished in 21st position in the final medal rankings, with two gold medals and four medals overall.

Gold

 Knut Knudsen — Cycling, Men's 4,000m Individual Pursuit
 Leif Jenssen — Weightlifting, Men's Light Heavyweight

Silver

 Frank Hansen and Svein Thøgersen — Rowing, Men's Double Sculls

Bronze

 Egil Søby, Steinar Amundsen, Tore Berger, and Jan Johansen — Canoeing, Men's K4 1,000m Kayak Fours

Archery

In the first modern archery competition at the Olympics, Norway entered one woman and three men in the competition. Their best finisher, at 32nd place in the men's competition, was Jan Erik Humlekjær.

Men's Individuel Competition:
 Jan Erik Humlekjær - 2339 points (→ 32nd place)
 Johannes Akkerhaugen - 2288 points (→ 36th place)
 Egil Borgen Johansen - 2219 points (→ 48th place)

Women's Individual Competition:
 Brit Stav - 1929 points (40th place)

Athletics

Men's 100 metres
Audun Garshol
 Heat — 10.49 s (→ advanced to the quarter final)
 Quarter final — 10.55 s (→ did not advance)

Men's 200 metres
Audun Garshol
 Heat — 21.16 s (→ advanced to the quarter final)
 Quarter final — 25.30 s (→ did not advance)

Women's 1500 metres
Wenche Sørum
 Heat — 4:14.10 min (→ advanced to the semi final)
 Semi final — 4:09.70 min (→ did not advance)
Grete Waitz
 Heat — 4:16.00 min (→ did not advance)

Men's 5000 metres
Per Halle
 Heat — 13:38.6 min (→ advanced to the final)
 Final — 13:34.38 min (→ 7th place)
Arne Risa
 Heat — 14:01.6 min (→ did not advance)
Knut Børø
 Heat — 14:15.8 min (→ did not advance)

Men's 10,000 metres
Arne Risa
 Heat — 14:01.6 min (→ did not advance)

Men's 3000 metres steeplechase
Jan Voje
 Heat — 8:42.0 min (→ did not advance)
Sverre Sørnes
 Heat — 8:54.8 min (→ did not advance)

Men's High Jump
Leif Roar Falkum
 Qualification — NM (→ did not advance)

Men's Long Jump
Finn Bendixen
 Qualification — 7.61 m (→ did not advance)

Men's triple jump
Kristen Fløgstad
 Qualification — 16.41 m (→ advanced to the final)
 Final — 16.44 m (→ 8th place)

Men's Javelin Throw
 Bjørn Grimnes
 Round 1 — 77.54 metres (→ advanced to the final)
 Final — 83.08 metres (→ 5th place)

Men's 20 km walk
 Jan Rolstad — 1:33:03 hrs (→ 11th place)

Men's 50 km walk
 Kjell Georg Lund — 4:34.23 hrs (→ 24th place)

Boxing

Canoeing

Cycling

Seven cyclists represented Norway in 1972.

Individual road race
 Tore Milsett — 17th place
 Thorleif Andresen — 70th place
 Arve Haugen — did not finish (→ no ranking)
 Jan Henriksen — did not finish (→ no ranking)

Team time trial
 Thorleif Andresen
 Arve Haugen
 Knut Knudsen
 Magne Orre

1000m time trial
 Harald Bundli
 Final — 1:09.72 (→ 18th place)

Individual pursuit
 Knut Knudsen

Diving

Men's 3m Springboard:
 Roar Løken — 514.92 points (→ 10th place)

Fencing

Five fencers, all men, represented Norway in 1972.

Men's épée
 Morten von Krogh
 Ole Mørch
 Jeppe Normann

Men's team épée
 Jan von Koss, Jeppe Normann, Ole Mørch, Claus Mørch Jr.

Gymnastics

Handball

Norway's 1-1-1 record in the first round put the team in a tie for second place with West Germany (which was the team that Norway had tied), but the advantage went to the West Germans and Norway's third-place finish put them into the ninth- to twelfth-place consolation bracket. They defeated Japan to set up a match with Poland for ninth and tenth places, which Norway won.

Men's Team Competition:
 Norway - 9th place (3-1-1)

Rowing

Men's Coxed Pairs
Rolf Andreassen, Arne Bergodd and Thor-Egil Olsen
Heat — 8:00.56
Repechage — 8:03.50
Semi Finals — 8:30.29

Shooting

Seven male shooters represented Norway in 1972.

25 m pistol
 Thor-Øistein Endsjø

50 m pistol
 John Rødseth

300 m rifle, three positions
 Helge Anshushaug
 Bjørn Bakken

50 m rifle, three positions
 Bjørn Bakken
 Helge Anshushaug

50 m rifle, prone
 Helge Anshushaug
 Jens Nygård

50 m running target
 John H. Larsen, Jr.
 Tore Skau

Swimming

Men's 100m Freestyle
Fritz Warncke
 Heat — 54.41s (→  22nd place, did not advance)

Men's 200m Freestyle
Fritz Warncke
 Heat — 2:00.98 (→  31st place, did not advance)

Men's 400m Freestyle
Sverre Kile
 Heat — 4:20.86 (→  did not advance)

Men's 400m Medley
Sverre Kile
 Heat — 4:59,72 (→  did not advance)

Women's 100m Freestyle
Grethe Mathisen
 Heat — 1:01.47 (→  17th place, did not advance)

Women's 200m Medley
Trine Krogh
 Heat — 5:25,08 (→  did not advance)

Women's 400m Medley
Trine Krogh
 Heat — 2:36,27 (→  did not advance)

Weightlifting

Wrestling

References

Nations at the 1972 Summer Olympics
1972 Summer Olympics
1972 in Norwegian sport